Peter Clifford (born 11 April 1944) is a British bobsledder. He competed in the two-man and the four man events at the 1972 Winter Olympics.

References

1944 births
Living people
British male bobsledders
Olympic bobsledders of Great Britain
Bobsledders at the 1972 Winter Olympics
Place of birth missing (living people)